Gerard Yepes Laut (born 25 August 2002) is a Spanish professional footballer who plays as a midfielder for the Italian club Sampdoria.

Club career
A youth product of Espanyol and Sant Andreu, Yepes signed with the youth academy of Sampdoria in 2018. He made his professional debut with Sampdoria in a 1–1 Serie A tie with Roma on 22 December 2021.

References

External links
 
 
 Sampdoria Profile
 Futbol Base Catala profile

2002 births
Living people
Footballers from Barcelona
Spanish footballers
Association football midfielders
Serie A players
U.C. Sampdoria players
Spanish expatriate footballers
Spanish expatriates in Italy
Expatriate footballers in Italy